Konstantinos Tsalkanis (born 23 April 1982) is a male water polo goalkeeper from Greece. He was part of the Greece men's national water polo team at the 2013 World Aquatics Championships in Barcelona, Spain, where they finished in 6th place.

See also
 Greece at the 2013 World Aquatics Championships

References

External links
profile at FINA

Greek male water polo players
Living people
Place of birth missing (living people)
1982 births
Mediterranean Games medalists in water polo
Mediterranean Games bronze medalists for Greece
Competitors at the 2013 Mediterranean Games